Gerry Ritz  (born August 19, 1951) is a former Canadian politician. He served as member of the House of Commons of Canada for Battlefords—Lloydminster from 1997 until his resignation in 2017. He served as Canada's agriculture minister from 2007 through 2015 under Prime Minister Stephen Harper.

Life and pre-political career
Ritz was born in Delisle, Saskatchewan, and prior to his political career, he worked as a farmer at the family farm for over 20 years and owned a contracting business company.

Federal politics
Ritz was elected as the Reform Party candidate in the 1997 general election and then re-elected with the Canadian Alliance in the 2000 election and the Conservative Party of Canada in the 2004 election. Ritz served as vice-chair of the House of Commons Agriculture Committee from 2002 to 2007. He was appointed secretary of state for small business and tourism in the Harper government on January 4, 2007.

Minister of Agriculture

On August 14, 2007, Ritz was promoted to the Cabinet as Minister of Agriculture and Agri-Food replacing Chuck Strahl.

Ritz made national news when, in response to the 2008 Canadian listeriosis outbreak he was quoted as saying, "This is like a death by a thousand cuts. Or should I say cold cuts." Then when told of a death in Prince Edward Island, Ritz said, "Please tell me it's (Liberal MP) Wayne Easter." Ritz later apologized for his comments, and Prime Minister Stephen Harper kept Ritz in Cabinet after the 2008 Canadian general election.

In September 2012, E. coli bacteria was found in meat from the XL Foods plant in Brooks, Alberta. This led to over 1800 products being recalled across Canada and the United States. The U.S. Department of Agriculture estimated that 1.1 million kilograms of meat from XL Foods were recalled from American stores. This was also the largest beef recall in Canadian history, with meat being recalled in every province and territory in Canada and 41 American states.

Opposition MP and resignation from politics
Ritz announced on August 31, 2017 that he intended to resign from the House of Commons in the near future and leave politics to spend more time with family.

On September 19, 2017, Ritz caused controversy when he tweeted a link to a news story stating no industrialized nations were on pace to meet Paris Agreement carbon emission targets with the comment "Has anyone told our climate Barbie! " (referring to Environment Minister Catherine McKenna). Ritz deleted the original post within 20 minutes, afterward posted another message stating: "I apologize for the use of Barbie, it is not reflective of the role the Minister plays". Conservative leader Andrew Scheer condemned Ritz's comment later in the day and stated he would reach out to McKenna personally to "assure the minister that this type of behavior has no place in the Conservative caucus". The next day Ritz's office issued a statement confirming his resignation from the House of Commons effective October 2, 2017.

Ritz's successor, Rosemarie Falk, was elected in a by-election on December 11, 2017.

Post federal politics 
In 2020, Ritz was elected as the reeve for the Rural Municipality of Mervin No. 499.

In 2022, he was involved in helping create the Saskatchewan United Party.

Electoral Record

References

External links

 Gerry Ritz official site

1951 births
Members of the 28th Canadian Ministry
Members of the King's Privy Council for Canada
Members of the House of Commons of Canada from Saskatchewan
Reform Party of Canada MPs
Canadian Alliance MPs
Conservative Party of Canada MPs
Living people
Canadian construction businesspeople
Farmers from Saskatchewan